Kerala Iyers, Pattars or Bhattars, are Tamil Brahmins of the Indian state of Kerala — people who were residents in the Kerala region, and also people who migrated from present day Tamil Nadu in different waves from the time of the Chera dynasty. They are Hindus. The community consists of two groups - the Palakkad Iyers and Iyers of the Cochin and Travancore regions.

Kerala Iyers, like the Iyers of Tamil Nadu and the Nambudiris of Kerala, belonged to the Pancha-Dravida classification of India's Brahmin community. They mostly belonged to the Vadama and Brahacharanam sub-sects. Iyers were usually not recruited as the priest (shanthi) in Kerala temples which followed Tantric rituals. So Iyers being Vedic scholars built their own temples in their Agraharams to conduct pooja, since they followed different rituals and not the Tantric rituals of the Nambudiris.

Brahmana Samooham 
Where ever they settled, the Kerala Iyers lived together in communities. The settlement consisting of array of houses and other amenities developed by Tamil Brahmins in Kerala came to be known as Agraharam as in other parts of South India. Each Agraharam consist of two rows of houses facing each other. There is no courtyard but only common street. Several such Agraharams together form an organization called "Samooham". There existed 95 Agraharams in Kerala where Brahmins lived in peace, with unity, equality and simplicity.

Palakkad Iyers 
The Palakkad Iyers were greatly affected by the Kerala Agrarian Relations Bill, (repealed in 1961 and substituted by The Kerala Land Reforms Act, 1963) which abolished the tenancy system.

Travancore Iyers 
During the rule of Travancore kings, many Iyers (Tamil Brahmins) migrated to Trivandrum. Tamil Iyers migrated mostly from Tirunelveli to Trivandrum.  The ancestors of the Trivandrum Iyers were brought from “Brahmadesam" (a village in Ambasamudram Taluk of Modern day Thirunelveli District in Tamil Nadu) by the Travancore Kings, to take part in the “Mura Japam” ritual of Sri Padmanabhaswamy temple. The Mura Japam ritual is a ritual where Brahmins with Sanskrit Veda knowledge participate.
The migration continued for decades, and thus Iyer population is concentrated around this temple in Trivandrum.They were given agraharams around the temple and the fort, as well as in Karamana Agraharam and Chalai Agraharam.

Notable people 

 Chembai
 Ajith Kumar | Tamil Actor 
 Vidya Balan
V. Dakshinamoorthy
 Hariharan
 Jayaram
 Ananth Iyer
 Divya S. Iyer
 Palghat Mani Iyer
 Shreyas Iyer
 Trisha Krishnan
 Shankar Mahadevan, a National Award-winning musician who has sung many songs in Tamil, Hindi, Malayalam, Kannada and Telugu
 K.V.Narayanaswamy
 Priyamani
 Malayattoor Ramakrishnan
 TN Seshan
 M. S. Thripunithura 
 Ranjani-Gayatri

Fictional characters
 Sethurama Iyer

Organization 
The Kerala Brahmana Sabha is the apex organization of Kerala Iyers.

Notes

References

External links 
Kerala Iyers Website

Tamil society
Tamil Brahmins
Ethnic groups in Kerala